Ophiocordyceps camponoti-rufipedis is a species of fungus that parasitizes insect hosts, in particular members of the order Hymenoptera.

Description
This species' mycelium is densely produced from all of its orifices and sutures; it is initially a silky white, becoming a ginger colour.

Its asci are 8-spored, hyaline and cylindrical, while the ascospores are multiserriate and vermiform; its apex is acute, with a rounded base.

References

Further reading
Evans, Harry C., Simon L. Elliot, and David P. Hughes. "Ophiocordyceps unilateralis: A keystone species for unraveling ecosystem functioning and biodiversity of fungi in tropical forests?." Communicative & integrative biology4.5 (2011): 598–602.
Andersen, Sandra B., et al. "Disease dynamics in a specialized parasite of ant societies." PLoS ONE 7.5 (2012): e36352.
Andersen, Sandra, and David A. Hughes. "Host specificity of parasite manipulation: Zombie ant death location in Thailand vs. Brazil." Communicative & integrative biology 5.2 (2012): 163–165.

External links

MycoBank

Ophiocordycipitaceae